The Secretariat-General for National Defence and Security (Secrétariat général de la défense et de la sécurité nationale) is an interministerial organ under the President of France. 

The Secretary General for National Defence is Stéphane Bouillon, appointed in 2020.

The organism was founded in 1906 as the Conseil supérieur de la défense nationale ("High Council of National Defence" or CSDN); it was later known as the Comité de défense nationale ("Committee for National Defence") then became the (Secrétariat général de la défense nationale or SGDN) "General secretary for national defence" in 1962.

On 13 January 2010, the SGDN received its current name.

External links 
 
  Official website of SGDSN
  English presentation

Government of France
Military of France